Whitakers  is a town in Edgecombe and Nash Counties in the U.S. state of North Carolina. It is divided between the two counties by railroad tracks and is the northernmost town in the two counties. It is part of the Rocky Mount, North Carolina Metropolitan Statistical Area. The population was 744 in 2010.

History
The Porter Houses and Armstrong Kitchen was listed on the National Register of Historic Places in 2002.

Geography
Whitakers is located at  (36.105951, -77.713582).

According to the United States Census Bureau, the town has a total area of .81 square miles (2.1 km), all land.

Demographics

2020 census

As of the 2020 United States census, there were 627 people, 304 households, and 173 families residing in the town.

2000 census
As of the census of 2000, there were 799 people, 331 households, and 219 families residing in the town. The population density was 977.9 people per square mile (376.2/km). There were 370 housing units at an average density of 452.9 per square mile (174.2/km). The racial makeup of the town was 40.55% White, 58.32% African American, 0.13% Native American, 0.88% from other races, and 0.13% from two or more races. Hispanic or Latino of any race were 0.88% of the population.

There were 331 households, out of which 24.5% had children under the age of 18 living with them, 38.4% were married couples living together, 20.5% had a female householder with no husband present, and 33.8% were non-families. 31.4% of all households were made up of individuals, and 13.9% had someone living alone who was 65 years of age or older. The average household size was 2.41 and the average family size was 3.04.

In the town, the population was spread out, with 22.0% under the age of 18, 7.5% from 18 to 24, 27.5% from 25 to 44, 25.5% from 45 to 64, and 17.4% who were 65 years of age or older. The median age was 41 years. For every 100 females, there were 88.0 males. For every 100 females age 18 and over, there were 84.3 males.

The median income for a household in the town was $24,141, and the median income for a family was $27,188. Males had a median income of $29,643 versus $21,736 for females. The per capita income for the town was $12,893. About 25.4% of families and 33.3% of the population were below the poverty line, including 50.2% of those under age 18 and 34.1% of those age 65 or over.

Notable people
Dwight Watson, aka "Tractor man," brought much of Washington, D.C. to a standstill for two days when he drove a tractor into the pond in the Constitution Gardens area of the National Mall and claimed to have explosives.
Nathan Mayo, Florida Commissioner of Agriculture

References

Towns in North Carolina
Towns in Nash County, North Carolina
Towns in Edgecombe County, North Carolina
Rocky Mount metropolitan area